Ravelston Corporation Limited was a Canadian holding company that was largely controlled by Conrad Black and business partner David Radler. At one time, it held a majority stake in Hollinger Inc., once one of the largest media corporations in the world. The company was placed into receivership in 2005 and went bankrupt in 2008.

History 
Ravelston was founded by a group of businessmen including Bud McDougald, Max Meighen and Conrad Black's father George Montegu Black. The company was a holding company for Argus Corporation. In 1978, Conrad Black took control with his brother of Ravelston after his father's death. Black later transformed Ravelston into a holding company which was the head of his global media empire in the 1980s and 1990s. The company was mostly owned by Black, who held a 67% share to Radler's 14%.

At one time, Ravelston controlled 78% of Hollinger Inc.'s stock with Black as CEO and Chairman and Radler as President. Ravelston held shares in Conrad Black's holding companies, such as Hollinger International, now known as Sun-Times Media Group. The Toronto-based private company had owned the British Daily Telegraph and Toronto's National Post newspapers. These papers were later sold, mostly to Canwest Global.

Demise  
As a result of Black's and Radler's legal problems involving allegedly unauthorized 'non-compete' payments in the sale of Hollinger International newspapers, Ravelston entered into receivership in summer 2005. On April 20, 2005, Black and Radler resigned from Ravelston to facilitate a filing for bankruptcy protection. Black and four other executive were later convicted of fraud over the diversion of $6 million from Hollinger International. Ravelson was also charged with fraud by the US Attorney's office in Chicago. In 2005, Ravelston was placed in the hands of court-appointed receiver RSM Richter. Richter negotiated a settlement of the charges on the company's behalf in 2007. In December 2008, the company went bankrupt.

References

Mass media companies of Canada
Canadian companies disestablished in 2008
Black family (Canada)